The Gerasimov Doctrine, named after the Chief of the General Staff of the Russian Armed Forces army general Valery Gerasimov, is a pseudo-military doctrine created by the Western media and some Russian analysts. It is based on Gerasimov’s views about American contemporary warfare, putting interstate conflict and warfare on a par with political, economic, informational, humanitarian and other non-military activities. It became known after Mark Galeotti coined the term in his blog "In Moscow Shadows" and the invasion and annexation of Crimea by Russia in 2014. Some Western analysts were convinced that the Russian actions reflected the "Gerasimov Doctrine" helping to spread the term and making it a buzzword.

The idea of the existence of a "Gerasimov Doctrine" is contested by many researchers and specialists in Russian military thinking and doctrine. According to them, the key elements of the Gerasimov Doctrine underlie the concept of New Generation Warfare.  Many also argue that Gerasimov never wanted to present a doctrine and rather was asking the scientists of the Russian Academy of Military Science to do research to help him to understand the new ways of Western warfare.

History 
The term Gerasimov Doctrine was coined by Mark Galeotti in his blog "In Moscow Shadows." At the time, Galeotti believed that General Valery Gerasimov presented his views of future warfare in an article published in the Voenno-Promyshlennyi Kurier called "Tsennost’ nauki v predvidenii’ [The Value of Science in Foresight] in the edition of 27 February–5 March 2013. This proved to be a misconception. Gerasimov’s article was the transcription of his annual speech and presentation at the Russian Military Academy of Science in March 2013, when he was trying to explain the way the West engages in warfare and the increasing significance of non-military instruments for achieving military objectives. In other words, it was Gerasimov’s views about American contemporary ways of warfare. This article was reprinted in the English-language magazine Military Review, and subsequently quoted many times in the Western press.

Gerasimov's Views on Future Warfare 
The doctrine calls for a 4:1 ratio of non-military to military action. Gerasimov emphasizes "the importance of controlling the information space and the real-time coordination of all aspects of a campaign, in addition to the use of targeted strikes deep in enemy territory and the destruction of critical civilian as well as military infrastructure." Also he proposes to cloak regular military units in "the disguise of peacekeeper or crisis-management forces."

Military action 
 Military measures of strategic deterrence
 Strategic deployment
 Warfare
 Peacekeeping operations

Non-military actions  
 Formation of coalitions and alliances.
 Political and diplomatic pressure.
 Economic sanctions
 Economic blockade
 Breakdown of diplomatic relations.                                                                                                                                                                                           
 Formation of political opposition.
 Action of opposition forces.
 Conversion of the economy of the country confronting Russia to the military rails.[Clarification needed]                                                                                                 
 Finding ways to resolve the conflict.
 Changing the political leadership of the country confronting Russia.
 Implementation of a set of measures to reduce tensions in relations after the change of political leadership.

In addition, the doctrine assumes "information confrontation," without specifying whether these activities are military or non-military.

Interpretation of the doctrine by some Western experts 
According to some experts, its key elements are based on the historical roots of Russia's previous military doctrine and show a striking similarity to the provisions of China's "Unrestricted Warfare" doctrine, published in 1999. It is believed that this doctrine can be seen as a reinterpretation in the realities of the 21st century of the well-known concept of unconventional warfare, which in modern Russian military terminology are called "nonlinear". 

Within this framework, the main goal of "nonlinear warfare" is to achieve the desired strategic and geopolitical results, using a wide toolbox of non-military methods and means: explicit and covert diplomacy, economic pressure, winning the sympathy of the local population, etc.

According to the U.S. military, the "Gerasimov Doctrine" represents the most complete embodiment of the latest achievements of Russian military thought in a new type of warfare, which demonstrates the unprecedented integration of all capabilities of national influence to achieve strategic advantages. Based on the discreteness of the idea of war, which was established in Russian culture by Leo Tolstoy's classic novel War and Peace, the Gerasimov doctrine has blurred the lines between the polarized states of "war" and "peace," introducing a kind of analog to the Western idea of an intermediate continuum or "gray zone". American analysts point out that the Russian military's use of the new developments surprisingly inverts some of the fundamental paradigms of armed confrontation that were laid down in the works of Carl von Clausewitz and have been considered immutable for centuries. 

For example, Clausewitz's description of war as a "continuation of politics, but by other means" no longer applies in the "Gerasimov doctrine" because it does not consider war as a continuation of politics, but politics as a continuation of war, emphasizing that the effective conduct of politics may involve a broader arsenal of non-military means and methods. Similarly, the Gerasimov Doctrine forces a reconsideration of several other important tenets, such as Clausewitz's military-theoretical understanding of the "centre of gravity" as a key point of effort.

Some Western experts appear to have been concerned by the apparent focus of the Russian "Gerasimov doctrine" on exploiting the weak links of the Western principle of managerial decision making, which is based on a system of checks and balances that implies exhaustive analysis of the situation, lengthy public discussion and extensive coordination of the efforts of various agencies (the State Department, the Department of Defense, etc.). 

In contrast, by relying upon the Russian model of governance, which according to some experts served as a partial basis for the Gerasimov Doctrine,  Gerasimov was said to have aimed to seamlessly combine all the authoritative institutions, making coordination between them completely unencumbered.

Application of the doctrine 
Given the release date of the Gerasimov report and Russia's subsequent actions, many experts are inclined to link these events and directly point to Russia's use of the doctrine against Ukraine and the U.S.

Criticism 
The majority of Russian experts believe that Gerasimov did not present anything new, and doubt the existence of such a doctrine.

In his blog, Jānis Bērziņš, former director and senior researcher with the National Defence Academy of Latvia, and nonresident researcher with the Swedish Defence University, pointed that Gerasimov's presentation and later publication in the VPK just reflected the main points some military thinkers, notably the Russian military thinkers Chekinov and Bogdanov, have been doing for years. Bērziņš additionally noted that Gerasimov’s main point was that he expects Military Science to help military leaders to think about practical problems of war, since he seems to be worried about Russia’s lack of strategy to defend itself against what he called “hybrid threats.”

Michael Kofman, Research Program Director in the Russia Studies Program at CNA and as a Fellow at the Kennan Institute, Woodrow Wilson International Center in Washington, DC, agrees that Mark Galeotti invented the term and that it does not exist in the Russian military thinking. He stressed that Gerasimov's speech "reflected general sentiments in Russian military thought on how the U.S. conducts political warfare via “color revolutions,” eventually backed by the employment of high precision weapons, with many of the observations derived from the Arab Spring. That article represented the Russian military interpretation (or more correctly misinterpretation) of the U.S. approach to conducting regime change, combined with a bureaucratic argument designed to link the budget of the Russian armed forces, consuming trillions of rubles each year, to an external challenge defined largely as political."

In 2016 Roger McDermott pointed out in Parameters journal that Gerasimov deliberately ignores the factors that conceptually unite the various wars and armed conflicts, emphasizing that each has its own history and unique path of development. As McDermott writes, the denial in the context of Gerasimov's ideas of a generalizing model that could be perceived as a holistic doctrine is more than compensated for by the meanings attributed to his statements by Western specialists. According to McDermott, myths about the emergence of Russia's latest and deadliest hybrid warfare doctrine are one of the most dangerous aspects of the confrontation between Russia and NATO.

Political scientist Mark Galeotti stated in an article for Foreign Policy that the famous "Gerasimov doctrine," which is understood in the West as an "expanded theory of modern warfare" or even "a vision of total war," does not exist in reality, and that he himself is the inventor of this term. In a 2018 article for Critical Studies on Security, Galeotti stated, "This is no 'new way of war'. It is not Gerasimov's, and it is not a doctrine."

See also 
 Dulles' Plan

Notes

References 
 Bērziņš, Janis (2020). The Theory and Practice of New Generation Warfare: The Case of Ukraine and Syria, The Journal of Slavic Military Studies, 33:3, 355-380, DOI: 10.1080/13518046.2020.1824109
 
 Chivvis C. "Understanding Russian "Hybrid Warfare". And What Can Be Done About it" RAND Corporation. 2017. — 1 марта.
 Henry Foy. "Valery Gerasimov, the general with a doctrine for Russia" Файненшл Таймс. — 2017. — 1 сентября.
 Hoffman, Frank G; Mattis, James N. "Future Warfare: The Rise of Hybrid Wars Proceedings" United States Naval Institute, 2005. pp 18–19.
 

War in Donbas
Foreign relations of Russia
Foreign policy doctrines